Romanowski (feminine Romanowska, plural Romanowscy) is a Polish surname derived from any of the locations named Romanów, Romany, or Romanowo, in their turn derived from the given name Roman. Other  equivalents: Romanovsky/Romanovskiy (Russian), Ramanouski (Belarusian), Ramanauskas (Lithuanian).

Notable people with the surname include:

 Alina Romanowski (born 1955), American career diplomat
 Anna Romanowska, Polish mathematician
 Bill Romanowski (born 1966), American football player
 Bolesław Romanowski (1910–1968), Polish World War II submarine commander
 Edward Romanowski (1944–2007), Polish athlete
 Eileen Romanowski (born 1984), Australian volleyball player
 Elżbieta Romanowska (born 1983), Polish actress
 Franklin Delano Romanowski, fictional character from Seinfeld
 Mieczysław Romanowski (1833–1863), Polish poet
 Sławomir Romanowski (born 1957), Polish sports shooter
 Wiesław Romanowski (born 1952), Polish publicist

References

Polish-language surnames
Toponymic surnames